Daventry may refer to:

Places

England
The town of Daventry in Northamptonshire, England
Daventry District, a former local government district of Northamptonshire, covering the town and surrounding rural areas
Daventry (UK Parliament constituency), a Parliamentary constituency, covering much of western Northamptonshire

Canada
Daventry, Ontario, an unincorporated place in Nipissing District, Ontario, Canada

United States
Daventry (Community) a residential community in the West Springfield area of Fairfax County, Virginia, USA.

Sport
 The Daventry Dolphins Swim Team competes in Division 11 of the Northern Virginia Swim League. They represent the Daventry residential community in the West Springfield area of Fairfax County, Virginia.
 Daventry Town F.C. football team based in Daventry, England.
 Daventry United F.C. former football team based in Daventry, England.

Transport
 Daventry railway station former railway station serving Daventry, England.
 Daventry International Railfreight Terminal (DIRFT), a railfreight terminal on the West Coast Main Line north of Daventry town

Fiction
The Kingdom of Daventry is a mythical kingdom and the main setting of the graphic adventure series King's Quest

Other uses
Daventry Experiment an early experiment with radar in 1935.